Eight is the eighth studio album by Japanese band Do As Infinity, released on January 19, 2011. Of the twelve music tracks on the album, four were previously released on three of Do As Infinity's singles. Two different editions of the album were released: a regular CD version and a CD+DVD limited edition. The DVD contained music videos for three songs and a short documentary.

Between September 1 and October 31, 2009, the second installment of a contest called Do! Creative!! was held to give Do As Infinity fans a chance to compose songs that the band would later perform. Of the songs received, "Everything Will Be All Right" composed by Shohei Ohi was selected to be placed on Eight.

Track listing
All music arranged by Seiji Kameda.

Charts

References

External links
Eight at Avex Network 

2011 albums
Avex Group albums
Do As Infinity albums
Albums produced by Seiji Kameda